Fatigue Mountain is located on the border of Alberta and British Columbia on the Continental DivideThe mountain was named in 1888 by W.S. Drewry who became fatigued on the first ascent.

Climate
Based on the Köppen climate classification, Fatigue Mountain is located in a subarctic climate zone with cold, snowy winters, and mild summers. Winter temperatures can drop below -20 °C with wind chill factors below -30 °C.

See also
 
List of peaks on the Alberta–British Columbia border
Mountains of British Columbia

References

Fatigue Mountain
Fatigue Mountain
Canadian Rockies